Spigno Saturnia is a town and comune in the province of Latina, in the Lazio region of central Italy.

Medieval Spinium, which had its own counts in the Norman period, corresponds to the frazione of Spigno Vecchio.

Origin of name 
The toponym "Spigno" derives from the spread over the territory of two thorny plants, the hawthorn and the wild plum, and from the fact that the latter was used by the Spigno inhabitants to make the fencing fences with its thorns more effective.

References

Cities and towns in Lazio